Jurien Bay Airport  is an airport in Jurien Bay, Western Australia.

See also
 List of airports in Western Australia
 Aviation transport in Australia

References

External links

 Airservices Aerodromes & Procedure Charts

Airports in Western Australia